Joshua W. Hathaway (November 10, 1797 – June 6, 1862), was a justice of the Maine Supreme Judicial Court from May 11, 1852, to May 10, 1859.

Born in the Province of New Brunswick, Hathaway graduated from Bowdoin College in 1820, and read law to be admitted to the bar in 1824. He resided in Bangor, Maine, where he was appointed Judge of District Court in 1848. He served in that capacity until 1852, when he was appointed to the Maine Supreme Judicial Court by Governor John Hubbard.

References

|-

Justices of the Maine Supreme Judicial Court
1797 births
1862 deaths
U.S. state supreme court judges admitted to the practice of law by reading law
Bowdoin College alumni
People from Bangor, Maine
19th-century American judges